The Kenilworth Lodge was an historic resort hotel located at 1610 Lakeview Drive in Sebring, Florida. Built in 1916 for George E. Sebring, the developer of the town of Sebring, it was continuously in use as a hotel until it was closed in 2016 for fire code violations. It was designed by Bonfoey & Elliott of Tampa, Florida in the Mediterranean Revival style of architecture. It was built by contractor B. A. Cope.

On June 15, 2000, it was added to the National Register of Historic Places.

References

External links
 Highlands County listings at National Register of Historic Places
 Florida's Office of Cultural and Historical Programs
 Highlands County listings
 Kenilworth Lodge

Buildings and structures in Sebring, Florida
National Register of Historic Places in Highlands County, Florida
Hotels in Florida
Hotel buildings on the National Register of Historic Places in Florida
Defunct hotels in Florida